Jenö Dzsingisz Gabor (born 14 March 1940) is a retired Hungarian–Dutch politician and diplomat of the Christian Democratic Appeal (CDA).

Decorations

References

External links
Official

  Drs. J.D. (Dzsingisz) Gabor Parlement & Politiek

 
 

 
 

1940 births
Living people
State Secretaries for Agriculture of the Netherlands
Mayors in Overijssel
Members of the House of Representatives (Netherlands)
Members of the Provincial Council of South Holland
Municipal councillors in Utrecht (province)
Christian Democratic Appeal politicians
Catholic People's Party politicians
Dutch nonprofit executives
Dutch nonprofit directors
Dutch lobbyists
Dutch Roman Catholics
Dutch people of Hungarian descent
Hungarian emigrants to the Netherlands
Tilburg University alumni
Knights of the Order of the Netherlands Lion
People from Győr
People from Woerden
People from Haaksbergen
People from Deventer
20th-century Dutch businesspeople
20th-century Dutch civil servants
20th-century Dutch diplomats
20th-century Dutch economists
20th-century Dutch politicians
21st-century Dutch businesspeople
21st-century Dutch diplomats